Oscar Beregi (born Oszkár Beregi, 24 January 1876 – 18 October 1965) was a Hungarian-Jewish actor who appeared primarily in German films.

Biography
Beregi was born in Budapest, Hungary, and was the father of actor Oscar Beregi Jr. He acted on stage in Hungary for 21 years. In April 1920, as "the only Jewish actor of prominence" acting with the Budapest National Theatre, he was the subject of a demonstration that led to the group's changing its program and presenting a play in which Beregi did not participate.

In the early 1920s, Beregi was exiled from Hungary because of his "alleged political activities". During the exile he acted in Vienna for four years. He served as president of the Film Actors' Association of Vienna. Beregi appeared in 27 films between 1916 and 1953. He played Professor Baum in Fritz Lang's film Das Testament des Dr. Mabuse. In 1926, Beregi signed a five-year contract with Universal Pictures.

Beregi died in Hollywood, California, and was buried in Budapest, Hungary.

Partial filmography

 Ártatlan vagyok! (1916) - Pierre, katonaorvos
 Mire megvénülünk (1917) - Áronffy Lóránd
 Hófehérke (1917) - Balassa Imre mérnök
 The Stork Caliph (1917) - Tábori báró / kikötõmunkás
 A föld embere (1917) - Bán Ferenc, bányamérnök
 Károly bakák (1918) - Epres János
 Az aranyember (Man of Gold) (1919) - Tímár Mihály
 Jön az öcsém ("My Brother is Coming") (1919, Short) - As öcs
 Ave Caesar! (1919) - Alexis gróf, testõrkapitány
 A tékozló fiú (1919) - Wagner Oszkár, a fia
 Meriota the Dancer (1922) - Cesare Borgia
 William Ratcliff (1922)
 Children of the Revolution (1923)
 Das verbotene Land (1924)
 Vier Nächte einer schönen Frau (1924)
 Die Tragödie einer Frau (1924)
 Die Sklavenkönigin ("The Moon of Israel", lit. "The Queen of the Slaves") (1924) - Amenmeses
 Jiskor (1924) - The Count
 Ssanin (1924) - Wladimir Petrowitsch Ssanin
 Das Gift der Borgia (1924)
 The Curse (1925) - Jehuda Nachmann
 The Love Thief (1926) - Prime Minister
 The Flaming Forest (1926) - Jules Lagarre
 Camille (1926) - Count de Varville
 Butterflies in the Rain (1926) - Lord Purdon
 The Woman on Trial (1927)
 Der Geliebte seiner Frau (1928) - Polizeikommissär Ralph Förster
 Andere Frauen (1928)
 Povara (1928) - George Stralila
 Love in May (1928)
 Der Dieb im Schlafcoupée (1929)
 Die Jugend am Scheideweg (1929)
 Juwelen (1930)
 A kék bálvány (1931) - Turner, milliomos
 An Auto and No Money (1932)
 Kísértetek Vonata (1933) - Dr. Stirling
 Das Testament des Dr. Mabuse ("The Testament of Dr. Mabuse") (1933) - Prof. Dr. Baum
 Iza néni (1933)
 Rákóczi induló (1933) - Báró Merlin Ádám, földbirtokos
 Anything Can Happen (1952) - Uncle John
 Tonight We Sing (1953) - Dr. Markoff (uncredited)
 Call Me Madam (1953) - Chamberlain (uncredited)
 Desert Legion'' (1953) - Si Khalil

References

External links
 
 

1876 births
1965 deaths
Hungarian Jews
20th-century Hungarian male actors
Hungarian male silent film actors
Hungarian emigrants to the United States
Male actors from Budapest
Hungarian expatriates in Austria